BBC News is the news-gathering operation of the BBC, and the largest news organization in the world.

BBC News may also refer to:

 BBC News (TV channel), a 24-hour domestic channel in the United Kingdom
 BBC News (TV series), a news programme broadcast on BBC News Channel
 BBC News at One, Six and Ten, news bulletins broadcast on BBC One and the News Channel
 BBC World News, a 24-hour international news channel
 BBC World News (TV series), a world news programme broadcast on BBC World News
 BBC News Online, the website of BBC News
 BBC News (radio series), a news programme broadcast on the BBC World Service
 BBC Radio 4 News, a news programme broadcast on BBC Radio 4

BBC News